The 2012 IRB Junior World Championship was an international rugby union tournament held in South Africa from 4 June until 22 June. The tournament was open to players who were born in or after 1992. This article lists the official squads for the 2012 IRB Junior World Championship in South Africa.

Pool A

Fiji
Fiji's 28-man squad for the 2012 IRB Junior World Championship.

Head Coach: Sale Sorovaki

New Zealand
New Zealand's 29-man squad for the 2012 IRB Junior World Championship.

Head Coach: Rob Penney

Samoa
Samoa's 28-man squad for the 2012 IRB Junior World Championship.

Head Coach: John Schuster

Wales
Wales's 30-man squad for the 2012 IRB Junior World Championship.

Head Coach: Danny Wilson

Pool B

England
England's 28-man squad for the 2012 IRB Junior World Championship.

Head Coach: Rob Hunter

Ireland
Ireland's 29-man squad for the 2012 IRB Junior World Championship.

Head Coach: Mike Ruddock

Italy
Italy's 30-man squad for the 2012 IRB Junior World Championship.

Head Coach:  Craig Green

South Africa
South Africa's 31-man squad for the 2012 IRB Junior World Championship.

Head Coach: Dawie Theron

Pool C

Argentina
Argentina's 28-man squad for the 2012 IRB Junior World Championship.

Head Coach: Facundo Soler, Bernardo Urdaneta Velez

Australia
Australia's 28-man squad for the 2012 IRB Junior World Championship.

Head Coach: David Nucifora

France
France's 31-man squad for the 2012 IRB Junior World Championship.

Head Coach: Didier Retiere

Scotland
Scotland's 28-man squad for the 2012 IRB Junior World Championship.

Head Coach: Peter Wright

References

External links

2012